Miriam Alejandra Bianchi (11 October 1961 – 7 September 1996), known by her stage name Gilda, was an Argentine cumbia singer and songwriter.

Biography

Career
Her stage name was chosen in honour of the femme fatale character played by Rita Hayworth in Gilda, the eponymous film. Gilda started getting involved in music while organizing festivals at a Catholic school. After meeting musician and agent Juan Carlos "Toti" Giménez, Gilda became a backup singer, joining a band called La Barra and soon participated in a second band called Crema Americana. In 1993, Giménez convinced her to start a solo career, recording De corazón a corazón ("From heart to heart") after signing up to local label Magenta. The following year, La única ("The one and only") featuring the hit Corazón herido ("Heart broken") and La puerta ("The door") was released.

In 1995, Pasito a pasito ("Step by step") was released, including the hit (and one of her most popular songs) No me arrepiento de este amor ("I don't regret this love").

Death
On 7 September 1996 Gilda died in a tragic accident while touring the country to promote her last and most successful album, Corazón valiente ("Brave heart"). Gilda, along with her mother, her daughter, three of her musicians and the bus driver died when a truck crossed the highway median and struck her touring bus head-on on km 129 of National Route 12 (Argentina) in the Province of Entre Ríos, Argentina.

Legacy

Shortly after her death, Gilda was credited by her fans with achieving miracles and some even called her a saint. On her birthday, fans go to her shrine at the accident site and leave blue candles, flowers, gifts and other offerings.

At the time of her death, Gilda was working on a new album, but only recorded five songs, which were included on the 1997 posthumous album called No es mi despedida ("Not my farewell"). The album included one of her most successful songs: "Se me ha perdido un corazón", two live songs and some songs of other tropical singers. Another album of unreleased material and demos called "Las alas del alma" was released in 1999. Among her best-known songs are Fuiste ("You were"), No me arrepiento de este amor and No es mi despedida.

Some of her songs were re-edited after her death, most notably Attaque 77's version of No me arrepiento de este amor.

Discography

Studio albums
 1992 – De corazón a corazón – Disgal S.A.
 1993 – La única – Clan Music
 1994 – Pasito a pasito con... Gilda (CD) – Clan music
 1995 – Pasito a pasito con... Gilda (LP) – Santa Fe Records
 1995 – Corazón valiente (Gold and Double Platinum album in Argentina) – :es:Leader Music
 1996 – Si hay alguien en tu vida – :es:Magenta Discos
 1997 – Entre el cielo y la tierra (posthumous) – Leader Music

Other albums 
 1997 – 17 Grandes éxitos y remixes – Por siempre Gilda – Universal Music Group
 1997 – Un sueño hecho realidad – Magenta Discos
 1998 – Por siempre Gilda 2 – Grandes Exitos y Remixados – Universal Music Group
 1999 – Cuando canta el corazón – Universal Music Group
 1999 – Las alas del alma – Leader Music
 1999 – Un sueño hecho realidad 2 – Temas inéditos – Magenta Discos
 1999 – Gildance – Músicavisión
 1999 – El álbum de oro – Universal Music Group
 2000 – Desde el alma [Grandes éxitos] – Universal Music Group
 2004 – Colección furia tropical – Warner Bros. Records
 2005 – Colección de oro Vol 1 – Magenta Discos
 2005 – Colección de oro Vol 2 – Magenta Discos
 2006 – Megamix (24 Hits) – Leader Music
 2007 – La única – Leader Music
 2008 – La más grande – Magenta Discos
 2011 – Un amor verdadero (DVD) – Leader Music
 2011 – 20 grandes éxitos – Leader Music
 2011 – No me arrepiento de este amor – Leader Music
 2014 – Grandes éxitos – Magenta Discos

In the media
In 2012 the Grupo Editorial Planeta published Gilda, la abanderada de la bailanta (her only authorized biography), by journalist Alejandro Margulis.

In 2015 the play Gilda was inaugurated in Buenos Aires with Florencia Berthold in the lead role and directed by Iván Espeche.

I'm Gilda, a biographical film about her life and career was released on 15 September 2016, the 20th anniversary of her death featuring Natalia Oreiro as Gilda as well as several musicians from her original band.

References
Portions based on a translation from Spanish Wikipedia.

External links
 
 Gilda, No Me Arrepiento de Este Amor on Facebook

1961 births
1996 deaths
Argentine people of Italian descent
20th-century Argentine women singers
Road incident deaths in Argentina
Burials at La Chacarita Cemetery
Folk saints